Scandal Savage is a fictional character, a supervillain and antiheroine appearing in American comic books published by DC Comics. She first appeared in Villains United #1 (July 2005), and was created by Gail Simone and Dale Eaglesham. She is the daughter of Vandal Savage and a member of the Secret Six.

Publication history 
Scandal first appeared as a shrewd businesswoman in Villains United #1 (July 2005) where she was created by author Gail Simone and artist Dale Eaglesham. Within this run her character was developed and revealed by the author to be as deadly a character as any of the others in Secret Six, where she unveiled her trademark "lamentation blades" and battle outfit. In Villains United #6, the character was officially confirmed to be among the few lesbian supervillains in the DC Universe.

The character subsequently appeared in the Secret Six miniseries later in 2006, as written by Gail Simone which would embellish upon the relationship between the character and her father Vandal Savage. In Simone's final run on Birds of Prey as part of the "Whitewater" story arc, she saw a crossover between the titular Birds of Prey and the Secret Six. When Tony Bedard assumed control of Birds of Prey, the characters of Knockout and Scandal continued to appear in issue #109 which followed from the conclusion of "Whitewater". Tying into the upcoming Salvation Run miniseries, the character would appear again immediately following Birds of Prey #109, in Checkmate #18 as part of an emerging build up towards Salvation Run.

Fictional character biography 
Scandal Savage is the daughter of immortal Vandal Savage and an unknown Brazilian woman, who apparently raised the child in her home country, though trained in combat by her father from childhood on. In an attempt to destroy an alternate Lex Luthor's plans, the real Lex Luthor, under the alias Mockingbird, blackmailed Scandal and five other villains into antagonizing the Secret Society of Super Villains. Despite being severely outnumbered, Scandal and the rest of the Secret Six were able to thwart the Society on a number of occasions. Eventually Luthor granted the Six their freedom, telling them the safeguards placed against their rebellion were lies.

While working with the Six was originally all about saving her mother, Scandal eventually grew to care about her teammates, and is actually in an intimate lesbian relationship with one of the other members. During Villains United, Scandal positioned her lover Knockout as a mole in the Society. During one of the attacks by the Society, Knockout revealed her true allegiances by saving Scandal during a fight with Talia al Ghul. Knockout then became an official member of the Six.

While the two were vacationing in Bangkok, Knockout was almost killed when she was shot with a Thanagarian sniper rifle by Pistolera. The shot implanted a bomb in her skin and when Scandal refused to leave her side, Knockout threw herself from the blast range telling her they would meet again in the afterlife. After the bomb went off, Scandal scrambled through the garbage to find Knockout miraculously still alive. Scandal vowed revenge on Pistolera for hurting Knockout, and soon would have it. The Secret Six managed to capture Pistolera and Scandal took pleasure torturing the hired gun.  Ultimately, Scandal could not kill the person who almost took her beloved from her, so her teammate, Deadshot, stepped in and did the deed for her. Knockout recovered from her injuries soon after.

It has recently been revealed that Vandal Savage was responsible for the attacks on Knockout and the rest of the Six, as a warning of what will happen if Scandal doesn't bear an heir for him. However, Scandal "killed" her father and escaped with the rest of the Six (minus the Mad Hatter).

Following this, the Secret Six were hired for mercenary work by a Russian mobster to protect a Rocket Red suit that was revealed to be occupied by the presumed-dead super-hero Ice. During the battle against the Birds of Prey for the suit and Ice, Spy Smasher made Deadshot accidentally shoot Scandal in the back. She appeared to be fine, but was too weak to continue the fight.

Following Knockout's murder by an unknown assailant, a drunk and distraught Scandal is kidnapped by Bronze Tiger and Rick Flag on the orders of Amanda Waller. King Faraday offers her a place in a revived Suicide Squad, but she refuses and promises to kill him. Faraday then orders her to be shipped off to an unknown location (see Salvation Run).

She was briefly seen attacking Bolt for groping her. She was also shown to at some point have gotten another tattoo underneath her left eye.

In the new Secret Six series (September 2008), Scandal was shown to still be drunk and depressed over the death of Knockout. Catman and Deadshot tried to cheer her up by having a naive stripper dressed like Knockout jump out of a cake for her, with one guest calling the sad display "morally indefensible". Scandal declined the stripper's advances, and managed to pull herself together for the Six's new mission. During that time, the Six's new member Bane developed a paternal affection towards Scandal, much to her discomfort. Following the mission's success, Scandal encountered the stripper she had rejected at a supermarket and learns her name is Liana Kerzner. Despite trying to turn her down again the stripper talks her into a double-date. After resurrecting Knockout with Neron's "Get Out of Hell Free" card, Scandal proposes a polygamous marriage among all three women, which both her lovers accept. The Secret Six are ultimately defeated and captured by an army of superheroes, with most of the team's fates (including Scandal's) left unrevealed due to the September 2011 reboot.

During the next Secret Six series set in the New 52, both Scandal and Knockout are shown to be perfectly healthy and living in freedom instead of prison, and are still happily together with Liana. The three make plans to have a child together, and Scandal has even chosen the man she wants to be the donor.

Powers and abilities 
The full extent of Scandal's powers has yet to be revealed, although it would appear that, owing to her father's immortality, she is incredibly resilient to harm. She claims to be "damned hard to kill" at the least. In Birds of Prey #107, she took a bullet from Deadshot and was capable of regrowing her damaged organs, talking to and carrying Knockout several minutes later with no apparent ill effects. In Checkmate (vol. 2) #18, it is speculated that she may be immortal like her father. She also took several rounds from a machine gun to the chest and legs and still considered herself combat ready (threatening to kill her assailants). She and other people have made comments that imply that her life had been or will be longer than average. She has proven herself to be a vicious fighter, capable of holding her own against the likes of Fatality, Hawkgirl, and Talia al Ghul.

In combat, she often employs a set of retractable, wrist-mounted blades - the Laminas Pesar or "Lamentation Blades", which Scandal claims have been in the family for a long time. The blades have two settings. One is a pair of long, awl-like blades designed for stabbing. The other is three knife-like blades designed for slashing. She was also seen riding a motorcycle and seemed to be capable of combat while still riding this (though this was never seen).

In other media

Television
 A daughter of Vandal Savage named Cassandra Savage appears in Legends of Tomorrow, portrayed by Jessica Sipos. She hails from the year 2166 and serves as one of Vandal's key lieutenants before the Legends reveal he killed her mother and convince Cassandra to betray him.
 Several offspring of Vandal Savage appear in Young Justice, with his daughters Cassandra and Olympia Savage (voiced by Zehra Fazal and Jenifer Lewis respectively) appearing in season three, Outsiders, and his sons Ishthur and Nabu appearing in flashbacks depicted in season four, Phantoms. Additionally, in the latter season, it is revealed Homo magi and Atlanteans are descended from Vandal through his grandson Prince Arion.

Film
Scandal Savage appears in Suicide Squad: Hell to Pay, voiced by Dania Ramirez. She initially works under Vandal Savage until he attempts to have her girlfriend Knockout killed while retrieving a "Get Out of Hell Free" card for him. Scandal later sells him out to the Suicide Squad before standing vigil over a hospitalized Knockout.

References

Characters created by Dale Eaglesham
Characters created by Gail Simone
Comics characters introduced in 2005
DC Comics characters with accelerated healing
DC Comics female superheroes
DC Comics LGBT supervillains
DC Comics metahumans
DC Comics supervillains
Fictional Brazilian people
Fictional lesbians
DC Comics LGBT superheroes
DC Comics female supervillains